Dolichoderus tricornis is a species of ant in the genus Dolichoderus. Described by Emery in 1897, the species is endemic to New Guinea.

References

Dolichoderus
Insects of New Guinea
Insects described in 1897
Endemic fauna of New Guinea